The Enchanted Wanderer (Очарованный странник) is a short novel by Nikolai Leskov, first published in Russkiy Mir newspaper in 1873.

Background
The original idea for the story came to Leskov after his visiting in 1872 Lake Ladoga and the Valaam monastery. In January Leskov sent the first version of the story, entitled Black Earth Telemachus (Черноземный Телемак) to The Russian Messenger, but Mikhail Katkov rejected it. In March Leskov sent the manuscript to the Dostoyevsky's Grazhdanin magazine, again to no avail. According to N.A. Lyubimov of The Russian Messenger, "Apart from some episodes, with Filaret and Saint Sergius, the whole thing appeared to [Katkov] more like a rough bulk of material for some future working upon… rather than the finished work, describing something real." As critic Boris Bukhstab later remarked, the story could have been construed as aimed against dvoryanstvo, weak and 'unmanly', according to the protagonist. This could have particularly upset Katkov, who had had disputes with Leskov previously, on that particular matter.

Dedication
The original version of The Enchanted Wanderer came out with a dedication to Sergey Egorovich Kushelev, an infantry general, close to the Russian Court, and Leskov's friend. "In the Autumn of 1872 as I've written The Sealed Angel… Adjutant-General Sergey Egorovich Kushelev visited me, asking for a manuscript to be taken to the Court so that Empress consort Maria Aleksanrovna could read it. This started my friendship with several houses which at the time regarded beau monde, particularly the Kushelev house where I've been received as a friend. There I met a lot of interesting people," Leskov remembered.

Synopsis
The novel doesn't have a coherent plot. Instead, it consists of various episodes of Flyagin's life, told by him to strangers he met. 

The protagonist, Ivan Flyagin, has been "promised to God" by his mother but refused to join the monastery as a young man, ignoring all the "signs", allegedly pointing him the way. The rest of his life, full of wandering, he sees as a "punishment" for this, and after all becomes a monk.

Reception
Contemporary critics' reaction was generally lukewarm. Narodnik Nikolay Mikhaylovsky in 1895, re-assessing the whole of Leskov's legacy, wrote: "In terms of fabula richness it might have been Leskov's most significant work, but total lack of focus is more than obvious so there is no fabula as such, rather a set of fabulas, strung together, so that any bead could be removed and replaced by another, and any number of other beads could be put onto the same string." Later critics praised The Enchanted Wanderer as one of Leskov's masterpieces where, according to D.S. Mirsky, the author used his unique gift of a storyteller to the fullest effect.

English translations
A. G. Paschkoff (1924)
David Magarshack (1946)
George H. Hanna (1958)
Ian Dreiblatt (Melville House, 2012)
Richard Pevear and Larissa Volokhonsky (2013)
Donald Rayfield (2020)

References

External links 
 Очарованный странник. The original Russian text.

Novellas by Nikolai Leskov
1873 novels